Burhan Alankuş (born 2 May 1950) is a Turkish alpine skier. He competed in the men's slalom at the 1968 Winter Olympics.

References

1950 births
Living people
Turkish male alpine skiers
Olympic alpine skiers of Turkey
Alpine skiers at the 1968 Winter Olympics
People from Sarıkamış
20th-century Turkish people